Karol Bielecki (born 23 January 1982) is a former Polish handball player who played for the Polish national team.

Career

He played for the national team, winning a silver medal in the World Handball Championship in 2007 and a bronze in 2009 and 2015. He announced his retirement from the national team on 13 April 2012, following the unsuccessful Olympic campaign of Poland.

On 11 June 2010, Bielecki received severe eye injury during a friendly match against Croatia. After additional tests and eye surgeries, it was determined that his left eye will remain blind. Although he first said that his years as a player were over, he decided to continue his career. He then played in special goggles and had scored 11 goals in his Bundesliga debut after the injury.

On 1 February 2015, Poland, including Bielecki, won the bronze medal of the 2015 World Championship.

He participated at the 2016 Summer Olympics in Rio de Janeiro, where he was the topscorer in the men's handball tournament.

On 20 May 2018, he announced his retirement as a player.

Achievements
PGE Vive Kielce
Polish Superliga: 2002–03, 2012–13, 2013–14, 2014–15, 2015–16, 2016–17, 2017–18
Cup of Poland: 2009
EHF Champions League: 2015–16 Vive Kielce
EHF Cup: 2006–07

SC Magdeburg
EHF Cup: 2006–07

Individual

Topscorer of the men's handball tournament at the 2016 Summer Olympics in Rio de Janeiro (55 goals)

State awards
 2007  Gold Cross of Merit
 2015  Knight's Cross of Polonia Restituta

References

External links

Profile

1982 births
Living people
People from Sandomierz
Sportspeople from Świętokrzyskie Voivodeship
Polish male handball players
Handball players at the 2008 Summer Olympics
Handball players at the 2016 Summer Olympics
Olympic handball players of Poland
Expatriate handball players
Polish expatriate sportspeople in Germany
Rhein-Neckar Löwen players
Handball-Bundesliga players
Vive Kielce players
Sportspeople with a vision impairment